Ministry of Industry and Mines is a government ministry of Algeria.

Subordinate under it is the National Agency of Investment Development (ANDIm ). It was established in 1993 as the Agency of Promotion, Support and Follow-up of Investment (APSI) and received its current name in 2001.

References

External links
 Ministry of Industry and Mines 
 National Agency of Investment Development
 National Agency of Investment Development 
 National Agency of Investment Development 

Industry and Mines